John Wise (before 1768-1812) was a Virginia politician.  He represented Accomack County in the Virginia House of Delegates, and served as that body's Speaker from 1794 until 1799.

References
List of former Speakers of the House of Delegates, in the old House chamber in the Virginia State Capitol

1812 deaths
Members of the Virginia House of Delegates
Speakers of the Virginia House of Delegates
People from Accomack County, Virginia
Year of birth uncertain
Virginia colonial people
Wise family of Virginia